Juan Carlos Zúñiga-Pflücker (born December 5, 1965) is an American-Canadian immunologist, currently a Canada Research Chair at the University of Toronto. His research focuses on the signaling processes that occur during the differentiation of cells in the immune system.

Education 
Zúñiga-Pflücker obtained his BSc in zoology from the University of Maryland in 1987 and his PhD in genetics and immunology from George Washington University in 1991.

Career 
Zúñiga-Pflücker is a senior scientist in Biological Sciences at the Odette Cancer Research Program at the Sunnybrook Research Institute. He is also the chair of, and professor in, the Department of Immunology at the University of Toronto. He is a fellow of Trinity College at the University of Toronto, and a member of the collaborative graduate program in developmental biology.

Zúñiga-Pflücker is a Tier 1 Canada Research Chair in Developmental Immunology.

His research focuses on blood cell differentiation, specifically the signaling that hematopoietic progenitor cells receive in the thymus to commit to the T cell lineage and undergo T cell differentiation.

Research Contributions 
Zúñiga-Pflücker identified the importance of Delta-like/Notch interactions for T cell differentiation in the thymus. Normally, OP9 cells, a bone marrow-derived stromal cell line, support the differentiation of hematopoietic stem cells into B cells. His lab identified that when OP9 cells ectopically express the Notch receptor ligands Delta-like-1 or Delta-like-4 they encourage T cell differentiation instead. OP9 cells expressing Delta-like-1 or Delta-like-4 were also able to induce differentiation of totipotent embryonic stem cells into functional T cells.

References

External References 

 https://www.youtube.com/watch?time_continue=8&v=eeG1pU9aMXo

1965 births
Living people
Academic staff of the University of Toronto
Canadian immunologists
University System of Maryland alumni
George Washington University alumni